Denton with Wootton is a civil parish in the Dover District of Kent, England.

The A260 Barham to Folkestone road runs through the parish, and a  section of the major A2 London to Dover road is part of the parish at the east.

Parishes surrounding Denton with Wootton are Barham at the north; Shepherdswell with Coldred at the north-east; Lydden at the south-east; Swingfield at the south; Acrise at the south-west; and Elham at the west.

The Lydden Hill Race Circuit is within the eastern border of Denton with Wootton.

There are two parish churches: St Martin's in Wootton, and St Mary Magdalene's in Denton.

Historically Denton and Wootton contained two manors each: Denton and Tappington at Denton; Wootton and Wickham Bushes at Wootton.

References

External links

Civil parishes in Kent
Dover District